Trypogeus is a genus of beetles in the family Cerambycidae, containing the following species:

 Trypogeus albicornis Lacordaire, 1869
 Trypogeus apicalis Fisher, 1936
 Trypogeus aureopubens (Pic, 1903)
 Trypogeus barclayi Vives, 2007
 Trypogeus cabigasi Vives, 2005
 Trypogeus coarctacus Holzschuh, 2006
 Trypogeus fuscus Nonfried, 1894
 Trypogeus javanicus Aurivillius, 1924
 Trypogeus sericeus (Gressitt, 1951)
 Trypogeus superbus (Pic, 1922)

References

Dorcasominae